Luis Jochamowitz (born Lima, Perú, 1953) is a Peruvian journalist and writer.

Jochamowitz has worked for the Peruvian magazines Variedades and Caretas.  In 1993, while Alberto Fujimori was president of Peru, he published Ciudadano Fujimori ("Citizen Fujimori"). He has also published El descuartizador del Hotel Comercio ("The Dismemberer of Hotel Comercio", 1995) and Vladimiro (2002, about Vladimiro Montesinos).  Jochamowitz's work also includes fiction such as Contra Dicciones ("Against Dictions") and Última Noticia ("Last News").

References

1953 births
Living people

Peruvian journalists
Male journalists
Peruvian male writers
Peruvian people of Croatian descent